"Brand New Friend" is a song by British band Lloyd Cole and the Commotions, released in 1985 as the lead single from their second studio album Easy Pieces. The song was written by band members Lloyd Cole and Blair Cowan, and produced by Clive Langer and Alan Winstanley. It peaked at number 19 in the UK Singles Chart and remained in the top 100 for nine weeks.

Background
In a 1985 interview with Sounds, Cole described "Brand New Friend" as being "about a character who's in a fairly pitiful position of being aware that he's not as happy as he once was, but not being sure what to do about it. He's also aware that he's verging on self-pity, which is also quite ridiculous. So it's quite funny too. He's aware it's a little cry for help."

Critical reception
Upon its release as a single, Diane Cross of Record Mirror described "Brand New Friend" as "another slightly uptempo, soulful sound from the man with the sorrowful eyes". She felt it would "probably manage to avoid chart domination, but will more than please his many fans". Frank Edmonds of the Bury Free Press gave the single an 8 out of 10 rating. He noted the "striking vocal married to a lovely tune" and added, "Cole just oozes stylish moodiness and here it spills out all over the record."

Karen Swayne of Number One commented, "Lloyd's mannered vocals are as appealing as ever, though a bit uncomfortable over such a jaunty little tune. There are strings and girl backing vocals thrown in for good measure, but I'd have preferred a simpler sound. Even so, it outclasses most of the week's releases." Sean O'Hagan of NME felt both "Brand New Friend" and its B-side, "Her Last Fling", are "haunted by the ghost of vintage Dylan/Reed/Ferry". He commented, "The opening line bodes well but Lloyd is still content to slip into the guise of his heroes and revisit territory that has already been done to death."

Track listing
7–inch single (UK, Europe, US, Canada and Japan)
"Brand New Friend" – 4:46
"Her Last Fling" – 2:46

7–inch single (Australasia)
"Brand New Friend" – 4:00
"Her Last Fling" – 2:46

12–inch single (UK, Europe and Australasia)
"Brand New Friend" (Long Version) – 5:34
"Her Last Fling" – 2:46
"2CV" (Recorded live) – 3:00
"Speedboat" (Recorded live) – 4:15

Personnel
Lloyd Cole and the Commotions
 Lloyd Cole – vocals, guitar
 Neil Clark – guitar
 Blair Cowan – keyboards
 Lawrence Donegan – bass
 Stephen Irvine – drums

Additional musicians on "Brand New Friend"
 Jimmy Thomas – backing vocals
 Jimmy Helms – backing vocals
 Lance Ellington  – backing vocals
 Anne Dudley – string arrangement

Production
 Clive Langer – producer ("Brand New Friend")
 Alan Winstanley – producer ("Brand New Friend")
 Lloyd Cole and the Commotions – producers ("Her Last Fling", "2CV", "Speedboat")
 Richard Sullivan – engineer ("Brand New Friend", "Her Last Fling")
 Mark Saunders – engineer ("Brand New Friend", "Her Last Fling")
 Kenny MacDonald – engineer ("Brand New Friend", "Her Last Fling")

Other
 Peter Anderson – sleeve
 Clare Cameron – sleeve

Charts

References

1985 songs
1985 singles
Lloyd Cole songs
Songs written by Lloyd Cole
Song recordings produced by Clive Langer
Song recordings produced by Alan Winstanley
Polydor Records singles